Bayshore MRT station is a future underground Mass Rapid Transit station on the Thomson–East Coast line in Bedok, Singapore, along Bayshore Road.

The station is located in the vicinity of the Bayshore Park, The Bayshore, and Costa Del Sol condominiums, as well as many other private houses and condominiums around Bayshore and Upper East Coast. The station will serve as the eastern terminus of the Thomson–East Coast line from 2024 to 2025, where it would then be replaced by Sungei Bedok when stage five of the line opens.

History

On 15 August 2014, LTA announced that Bayshore station would be part of the proposed Thomson–East Coast line (TEL). The station will be constructed as part of Phase 4, consisting of 8 stations between Founders' Memorial and Bayshore, and is expected to be completed in 2024.

Construction commenced in 2016, with completion in 2024.

Initially expected to open in 2023, the restrictions on the construction due to the COVID-19 pandemic has led to delays in the TEL line completion, and the date was pushed to 2024.

References

External links

Proposed railway stations in Singapore
Mass Rapid Transit (Singapore) stations
Railway stations scheduled to open in 2024